The China National Traditional Orchestra (CNTO) (also called China National Orchestra) is a 110-piece orchestra of traditional Chinese musical instruments with an accompanying folk choir. Founded in Beijing, China in 1960, the orchestra is a state-level (national) performing arts institution directly administered and endorsed by China's Ministry of Culture (MOC). Its mission is to promote and advance China's musical heritage.  is part of a cultural exchange program called Image China and the orchestra is managed by the China Arts and Entertainment Group (CAEG).

History 
The China National Traditional Orchestra was founded by composer and conductor Li Huanzhi (1919–2000), the former chair of the Chinese Musicians' Association. 's current president and producer is musician and ethnomusicologist Xi Qiang, who is a member of the National Committee of the Chinese People's Political Consultative Conference. In 1993, the China National Traditional Orchestra founded Orchestra Asia, together with Ensemble Nipponia of Japan and the South Korean National Orchestra.

In the interest of promoting a larger view of Chinese culture,  became the first Chinese orchestra known for combining music performance with other Chinese art forms, such as painting. Its 2015 concert tour Rediscover Chinese Music, was promoted as "a breathtaking multimedia experience" with storytelling, lighting and sound special effects, multimedia backdrops, and moving scenery.

Alternate names
The China National Traditional Orchestra has been known by several English names over the years, largely due to challenges with Chinese translation. The orchestra's Chinese name is pronounced in Chinese as Zhōngguó Zhōngyāng Mínzú Yuètuán, where Zhōngguó means "China," zhōngyāng means "central," and mínzú yuètuán means "ethnic nationalities" orchestra.

In English-speaking countries, the  has been misidentified as other similarly named Chinese orchestras. The orchestra has also been referred to by different names within the same news article and in the orchestra's own promotional materials.

English variants of the orchestra's name include:

Perhaps owing to its favored relationship with China's Ministry of Culture, orchestra leadership might have continually revised the ensemble's English name to reflect its current importance or social status, differentiate it from countless other Chinese orchestras, and emphasize the 's stated mission of "sharing China's musical heritage with the world." In 2015, the orchestra has been consistently billed and promoted as the China National Traditional Orchestra at the Kennedy Center, Carnegie Hall, and Lincoln Center, as evidenced by venue calendars and ticket sales webpages.

Notable orchestra members 
 Xi Qiang, producer and president of the orchestra

Musicians
Wang Chaoge, director
Jiang Ying, composer and arranger
Liu Sha, conductor
Tang Feng, Erhu
Jin Yue, Erhu
Wang Ciheng, Dizi and Xiao
Wu Yuxia, Pipa and deputy president of the orchestra 
Zhao Cong, Pipa
Yu Yuanchun, Pipa
Wei Yuru, Ruan
Feng Maintain, Ruan
Niu Jiandang, Suona
Zhu Jianping, percussion
Yu Xin, percussion
Chen Shasha and Ding Xiaokui, Dizi
Zhang Jiali, Guan
Lu Ning, Guqin

Creative team 
 Li Bin, stage design
 Wang Yugang, lighting design
 Gan Hua, multimedia design
 Zheng Zejian, multimedia design
 Zuo Huanyu, costume design
 Shen Tian, sound design

Performances 
The orchestra has performed throughout China and visited dozens of nations on five continents.

Highlights 
 In 1984, American classical composer Shen Sinyan, a member of the Chinese Music Society of North America, invited the orchestra to tour the United States. The orchestra became "the first Chinese orchestra of Chinese instruments" to do so.
 In 1996, the Carnegie Hall Corporation commissioned Chinese-American composer Bright Sheng to create Spring Dreams, a concerto for Yo-Yo Ma and the orchestra. 
 In 1997, Spring Dreams was performed by the orchestra and the famed cellist.
 In 1998, the orchestra performed for the first time at a special New Year concert in the Vienna Golden Hall (a.k.a. Wiener Musikverein).
 In 2004, the orchestra cancelled its appearance at a concert that contained Christian content. 
 In 2011, the orchestra became the first traditional Chinese music group to perform at Austria's Salzburg Summer Festival.
 In 2014, American pop music artist Katy Perry visited the orchestra to hear an arrangement of her song "Roar" played on traditional Chinese instruments.
 In December 2015, members from the orchestra performed for and with students of Washington Yu Ying Public Charter School in a school assembly; the first time the orchestra had performed for local primary school students. The school's chorus – 40 singers, ages 9 to 11 – also performed a song with the orchestra during its Kennedy Center concert dates.

Criticism 
The China National Traditional Orchestra has faced its share of criticism in the past – both at home and abroad – in that it did not actually promote actual traditional Chinese music in the beginning, but rather, it used the Western-style orchestra model that was prevalent in much of the orchestra world. Historically, traditional Chinese music was performed with soloists or in small ensembles rather than in large concert halls. What's more, to be more accessible to Western audiences when playing internationally, the orchestra's concert repertoire has in the past included works by Bach and Strauss, and contemporary songs like "New York, New York", and non-Chinese patriotic hymns like "America the Beautiful". In recent years, the orchestra has focused on the commission and arrangement of more traditional pieces representative of its heritage.

Not to be outdone by Western or popular music trends, the orchestra also collaborates with well-known directors like Wang Chaoge to help inject energy into traditional music performances by "creating innovative shows." The orchestra's performances outside of China appear to be well received, as inferred by sold-out concerts, standing ovations, multiple encores, and media coverage. For example, at the December 2015 Kennedy Center premiere of Rediscover Chinese Music, an audience member was recorded on camera saying "[the show] was moving. It was beautiful." One could assume that the orchestra's efforts to fuse modern stage production values with ethnic melodies has been a successful tactic in attracting new, enthusiastic audiences.

Notes

References

External links
2015 US Concert Tour – Official Website
2015 US Concert Tour – Facebook Fan Page
2015 US Concert Tour – Twitter Profile
Official website in China
Archived version of former version of official website in China

Chinese orchestras
Culture in Beijing
Musical groups established in 1960
Chinese musical instrument ensembles
1960 establishments in China